Angela Jennifer Lambert (born May 22, 1974) is an American musician, and the daughter of Nancy Sinatra and granddaughter of Frank Sinatra.

References

1974 births
Living people
American musicians
Sinatra family